Kalateh-ye Hajji Ali Dad (also Romanized as Kalāteh-ye Ḩājjī ‘Alī Dād; also known as Kalāteh-ye Ḩājjī ‘Alī, Ḩājjī ‘Alīdād, and Kalāteh-ye Hat‘alt) is a village in Dughayi Rural District, in the Central District of Quchan County, Razavi Khorasan Province, Iran. At the 2006 census, its population was 31, in 9 families.

References 

Populated places in Quchan County